The 2012–13 Yale Bulldogs men's ice hockey team represented Yale University in the 2012–13 NCAA Division I men's ice hockey season. The Bulldogs were coached by Keith Allain who was in his seventh season as head coach. His assistant coaches were Red Gendron and Dan Muse. The Bulldogs played their home games in Ingalls Rink and competed in the ECAC Hockey conference.

The Bulldogs posted a regular season record of 16 wins, 10 losses, and 3 ties.  They were seeded third for the 2013 ECAC Hockey men's ice hockey tournament, winning their quarterfinal series, but losing in the semifinals to eventual champion Union.  Yale was invited to the 2013 NCAA Division I men's ice hockey tournament as the tournament's 15th overall seed out of 16 teams, and the 4th seed in the west regional.  In their first game in Grand Rapids, Michigan, the Bulldogs defeated Minnesota, 3–2, on a Jesse Root goal 9 seconds into overtime.  In the second round against North Dakota, Yale trailed most of the game, before netting 4 goals in the final 8 minutes to win 4–1 and advance to the school's first Frozen Four since 1952.

In the Frozen Four at Consol Energy Center in Pittsburgh, the Bulldogs scored 2 goals in the first period against UMass Lowell, before the River Hawks answered with 2 goals in the second.  After a scoreless third period, captain Andrew Miller scored 6:59 into overtime to send the Bulldogs to the national championship against Quinnipiac, setting up an all-ECAC and all-Connecticut matchup.  In the final, goaltender Jeff Malcolm stopped all 36 Quinnipiac shots, and the Bulldogs scored 4 to win their first national championship.

2012–13 Roster
As of March 31, 2013.

Standings

Schedule

|-
!colspan=12 style="color:white; background:#00356B" | Exhibition

|}

*Non-conference game

Postseason

2013 national championship

Player stats

Skaters

Goaltenders

Rankings

Note: USCHO did not release a poll in week 25.

Players drafted into the NHL

2013 NHL Entry Draft

† incoming freshman

References

Yale Bulldogs men's ice hockey seasons
Yale
Yale
Yale
Yale
Yale
Yale